Catherine Emily Pine (7 May 1864 – 14 August 1941) was active in the women's suffrage movement in Britain. She took care of the suffragette Emmeline Pankhurst and her son Henry. Pine travelled with Pankhurst until she decided to move back to Britain permanently in 1924.

Family and education
Catherine Emily Pine  was born on 7 May 1864. Her parents were Robert Pine, a corn merchant, and his wife, Anne Bret. Catherine trained to be a nurse; she who supported the woman's suffrage movement by working as the Pankhurst family's personal nursing assistant. Pine attended a school for nursing and trained as a nurse at St Bartholomew's Hospital between 1895 and 1897. After qualification she remained until she was promoted to Hospital Sister in 1900.

Career and support for suffragettes
Pine opened a clinic in 1907 in Pembridge Gardens, Notting Hill, London, working with Nurse Catherine Townend, where suffragettes who had gone on hunger strike in prison were taken after being released. Pankhurst was one of the imprisoned suffragettes that underwent care at the nursing home. Pine also took care of Pankhurst's son, until he died in 1910.

Relationship with the Pankhursts
When Pine first started working at her nursing home, she took care of Pankhurst's son, Henry, who was there because of an inflammation of the bladder. Pankhurst soon viewed Pine as a friend and a competent nurse. Pine worked in the home procured by the Pankhurst at Tower Cressy, Campden Hill but was not in sympathy with the Montessori teaching methods used by Jenny (Jane) Kenney for the children there. Then Pine and the Pankhursts went to Paris in early 1919, for a scene change while Emmeline worked for the suffrage movement. That September, they sailed to the United States and Canada, although Emmeline longed to go home, she knew she had a job to do with Catherine.  A lot of the time, Emmeline was not at home, so Pine was charged with the duties of taking care of Pankhurst's children.

Suffragette Medal 
Pine was given a suffragette medal and left it to the British College of Nursing, but her library and mementos were given to the Museum of London

References

British suffragists
1864 births
1941 deaths
Nurses from London